Psurów  (German: Psurow) is a village in the administrative district of Gmina Radłów, within Olesno County, Opole Voivodeship, in south-western Poland.

References

Villages in Olesno County